Liu Yue (born 14 September 1997) is a Chinese footballer who currently plays for China League One side Wuhan Three Towns, on loan from Chinese Super League club Shenzhen.

Club career
Liu Yue was promoted to China League One club Shenyang Dongjin's first team squad at the age of 15 in 2012. He made his senior debut on 15 April 2014 when Shenyang Dongjin played in the China League Two, in a 4–0 defeat against Beijing Institute of Technology in the 2014 Chinese FA Cup.

Liu transferred to China League One side Zhejiang Yiteng in 2016. On 12 April 2016, he made his debut for the club in a 1–0 defeat against amateur club Shanghai Jiading Boo King in the second round of 2016 Chinese FA Cup. He made his League One debut four days later on 16 April 2016 in a 2–1 away loss against Qingdao Huanghai, coming on for Piao Taoyu in the 85th minute. Liu became a regular starter after the match and scored his first senior goal on 2 May 2016, in a 2–0 win over Hunan Billows. He made 23 league appearances and scored one goal for Yiteng in the 2016 season. Liu continued his promising performances in the 2017 season, scoring two goals in 26 appearances.

Liu transferred to Chinese Super League side Tianjin Quanjian on 26 February 2018. On 2 March 2018, he made his debut for the club in a 4–0 away win against Henan Jianye.
In February 2019, Liu was loaned to China League One side Inner Mongolia Zhongyou for the 2019 season.

In July 2020, Liu was one of eight former Tianjin Tianhai players to sign with Shenzhen FC. He would go on to make his debut on 9 September 2020 in a league game against Guangzhou Evergrande Taobao F.C. in a 2-0 defeat.

Career statistics
.

References

External links
 

1997 births
Living people
Chinese footballers
Footballers from Wuhan
Shenyang Dongjin players
Zhejiang Yiteng F.C. players
Tianjin Tianhai F.C. players
Inner Mongolia Zhongyou F.C. players
Shenzhen F.C. players
Chinese Super League players
China League One players
China League Two players
Association football midfielders